Seo Sang-yeong (born 13 March 1945) is a South Korean boxer. He competed in the men's flyweight event at the 1968 Summer Olympics.

References

External links
 

1945 births
Living people
South Korean male boxers
Olympic boxers of South Korea
Boxers at the 1968 Summer Olympics
People from Geoje
Asian Games medalists in boxing
Boxers at the 1966 Asian Games
Asian Games silver medalists for South Korea
Medalists at the 1966 Asian Games
Flyweight boxers
Sportspeople from South Gyeongsang Province